The Neo-Luciferian Church is a Gnostic Luciferian organisation with roots in Western esotericism, Thelema, and magic.

History
The Neo-Luciferian Church began in 2005 as a collaboration between Danish occultist Bjarne Salling Pedersen and the American artist, author and philosopher Michael Bertiaux. The Church was inspired as a reawakening and modern interpretation of the Luciferian Gnosticism advocated by early 1900s Danish occultist and Ordo Templi Orientis member Ben Kadosh, pseudonym of Carl William Hansen. Today the organisation is primarily active in Denmark and Sweden.

Teachings
The Neo-Luciferian Church incorporates elements from Thelema, Gnosticism, Voodoo, traditional occultism, and witchcraft. There is an emphasis on art, psychology, and critical thinking.

The mythology draws heavily on Roman and Greek sources, and more dubious modern writings such as Charles Leland's Aradia, or the Gospel of the Witches, the works of Dion Fortune, Michael Bertiaux, and Aleister Crowley.

The Neo-Luciferian Church operates within a grade system of seven degrees and belongs in the succession from a number of churches, some Gnostic and magical in origin, others belonging to the succession described in the Ecclesia Gnostica Spiritualis.

References

External links
The Neo-Luciferian Church

Luciferianism
Religious organizations based in Denmark